The Immediate Geographic Region of Lavras is one of the 10 immediate geographic regions in the Intermediate Geographic Region of Varginha, one of the 70 immediate geographic regions in the Brazilian state of Minas Gerais and one of the 509 of Brazil, created by the National Institute of Geography and Statistics (IBGE) in 2017.

Municipalities 
It comprises 14 municipalities.

 Bom Sucesso
 Cana Verde
 Carrancas
 Ibituruna
 Ijaci
 Ingaí
 Itumirim
 Itutinga
 Lavras
 Luminárias
 Nepomuceno
 Perdões
 Ribeirão Vermelho
 Santo Antônio do Amparo

References 

Geography of Minas Gerais